Oerstedia is a genus of worms belonging to the family Oerstediidae.

The species of this genus are found in Europe, North America.

Species:

Oerstedia crassus 
Oerstedia dorsalis 
Oerstedia esbenseni 
Oerstedia gulliveri 
Oerstedia immutabilis 
Oerstedia laminariae 
Oerstedia maculata 
Oerstedia nigra 
Oerstedia oculata 
Oerstedia patriciae 
Oerstedia phoresiae 
Oerstedia polyorbis 
Oerstedia roscoviensis 
Oerstedia rustica 
Oerstedia similiformis 
Oerstedia striata 
Oerstedia tenuicollis 
Oerstedia valentinae 
Oerstedia venusta 
Oerstedia verae 
Oerstedia wheeleri 
Oerstedia wijnhoffae 
Oerstedia zebra

References

Nemerteans